Keith Donald "Doc" Herber (January 3, 1949 – March 13, 2009) was an American author, editor, and musician.

Career
Keith Herber was born in Detroit, Michigan, United States.  He began working on the fourth edition of Chaosium's Call of Cthulhu role-playing game in 1989; he was the line editor for the game for the next five years, including the change to the fifth edition of Call of Cthulhu in 1992, until he left Chaosium in 1994. While there he wrote and edited such award-winning books as The Fungi from Yuggoth, Trail of Tsathogghua, Spawn of Azathoth, Arkham Unveiled, Return to Dunwich, Investigator’s Companion Volumes 1 & 2, and the Keeper’s Compendium. The anthology Cthulhu's Dark Cults was dedicated to his memory.

Herber wrote for Pagan Publishing's The Unspeakable Oath magazine. Following his time at Chaosium, Herber wrote two novels for White Wolf's Vampire game as well as the Tremere Clanbook. He also served as an editor for Cinescape Magazine.

Herber's venture at the time of his death was Miskatonic River Press, a publishing company started in 2009 to produce a number of supplements for Call of Cthulhu, as well as several fiction anthologies.

Throughout his time as an author and editor, Herber played bass guitar for blues and rock bands across the United States, including Detroit's Progressive Blues Band, Dr. John, Bonnie Raitt, Mitch Ryder, The Fabulous Thunderbirds and opening for The Temptations, John Mayall, The Violent Femmes, and others.

Herber died in Lakeland, Florida in March 2009, aged 60.

Roleplaying game credits

Fiction credits

References

External links
Author Profile at 'Fantastic Fiction'
Author Profile at 'Miskatonic River Press' website

 

1949 births
2009 deaths
American blues guitarists
American male guitarists
American rock bass guitarists
American male bass guitarists
Blues bass guitarists
Chaosium game designers
Cthulhu Mythos writers
20th-century American musicians
Guitarists from Detroit
20th-century American guitarists
20th-century bass guitarists
20th-century American male musicians